Morteza Kashi (born May 4, 1981) is an Iranian football player who plays in the defender position. He is currently a member of the Iran's Premier League football club, Saba Qom.

Club career 
Kashi started his career at Azadegan League club Homa FC, before moving to then Azadegan League side Paykan. His transfer to the IPL outfit Saba Battery in 2006 was his debut in the Premier League.

Club career statistics

 Assist Goals

International career
Kashi played for Iran at the 2001 FIFA World Youth Championship.

References

Iranian footballers
Association football defenders
Paykan F.C. players
Saba players
Persian Gulf Pro League players
1981 births
Living people